is a masculine Japanese given name which is occasionally used as a surname and means wintry tree.

 (born 1960), Japanese professional wrestler
 (born 1955), Japanese photographer
 (born 1973), Japanese performance artist

In fiction
 In the Fate/ series, there is a fictional city called Fuyuki City. In which the entire series of Fate/Zero, Fate/stay night, Fate/hollow ataraxia, and Fate/kaleid liner PRISMA☆ILLYA all take place in.

References

Japanese-language surnames
Japanese masculine given names

ko:나쓰미